Antoine Louis François de Bésiade (1759–1811) was a French nobleman and favourite of the future Louis XVIII of France.

References

 Évelyne Lever, Louis XVIII, Paris, Hachette, 1993, 600 p.

1759 births
1811 deaths
French royal favourites
Court of Louis XVI